Dark Celebration is a paranormal/suspense novel written by American author Christine Feehan. Published in 2006, it is the 17th book in her Dark Series. and is unique among the other books in the series, offering glimpses of life from previous characters from the series as well as introducing new characters.

Plot summary
Raven Dubrinsky, lifemate to the Prince has contacted other lifemates in an effort to join the Carpathians in a Christmas Celebration.  Jacques' lifemate Shea is due to give birth at any time and the women feel that a gathering of the Carpathian community will help aid her. Before the celebration begins, Mikhail feels obliged to visit all of the Carpathian couples and we are given slices of life from lifemates in previous books. All the while there is a plot set by their enemies in an effort to destroy the Prince and the Carpathian people, making this a Dark Celebration.

Main characters
Unlike other books in the series this one is unique offering glimpses of life from previous characters from the series as well as introducing new characters without having a main couple. Previous characters include:

Mikhail and Raven from Dark Prince
Gabriel and Francesca from Dark Legend
Jacques and Shea from Dark Desire
Gregori and Savannah from Dark Magic
Aiden and Alexandria from Dark Gold
Julian and Desari from Dark Challenge
Darius and Tempest from Dark Fire
Barack and Syndil from Dark Fire
Lucian and Jaxon from Dark Guardian (Dark Series)
Byron and Antonietta from Dark Symphony
Riordan and Juliette from Dark Hunger
Rafael and Colby from Dark Secret
Traian and Joie from Dark Descent
Nicolae and Destiny from Dark Destiny (Dark Series)
Vikirnoff and Natalya from Dark Demon
Dayan and Corrine from Dark Melody
Falcon and Sara from Dark Dream

Awards and nominations
New York Times Bestseller List
USA Today Bestseller List
Publishers Weekly Bestseller List
Barnes & Noble Mass Market Bestseller List
Bookscan Bestseller List
Border's Group Bestseller List
Amazon Bestseller List
Walmart Bestseller List

References

2006 American novels
Novels by Christine Feehan
American vampire novels
Berkley Books books